Swanton Morley is a village and civil parish situated in the English county of Norfolk. It is situated in the heart of Norfolk 18 miles from the centre of Norwich and three miles from Dereham, at the geographical centre of Norfolk. For the purposes of local government it is in the Elmham and Mattishall Division of Norfolk County Council and the Lincoln Ward of Breckland District Council.

The village has a long history; it was documented in the 11th-century Domesday Book, and was home to the ancestors of Abraham Lincoln, 16th President of the United States. It has links to the armed forces through the nearby Robertson Barracks.

The village has won several awards including the Calor Village of the Year award 2009/10 for the East of England.

Geography
Swanton Morley is located centrally between the market towns of Dereham, Swaffham and Fakenham, Dereham being the closest at three miles away. The village is adjacent to Bylaugh and Bylaugh Hall and is 18 miles (29 km) from the city and county town of Norwich.

History
The first part of the village's name "Swanton" is derived from the Old English for herdsman's enclosure. The second part, "Morley", refers to Robert de Morli, who held the lordship of the manor in 1346. The village was the home of Richard Lincoln (1550–1620), a local churchwarden who built the building which is today The Angel public house. Lincoln was the wealthy grandfather of Samuel Lincoln, and Richard's coat-of-arms can be seen today in the east window of All Saints' Church in Swanton Morley. Richard Lincoln disinherited Samuel's father Edward from his will in favour of his fourth wife, thus throwing the Lincoln family into penury and forcing young Samuel to flee to Hingham, Massachusetts. His great-great-great-great-grandson was Abraham Lincoln, 16th President of the United States. Richard Lincoln is buried under the centre aisle of St Andrew's Church in Hingham, Norfolk, a privilege reserved for the gentry.

Notable buildings and facilities

On the top of a hill to the north of the village lies All Saints' Church, a large 14th-century parish church built to an ambitious design in comparison to the size of the village. In particular the aisles of the nave extend to embrace the tower, which is supported on three sides by unusually large arches. All Saints is described by architectural critic Nikolaus Pevsner as "big and proud, and historically outstandingly interesting". In addition to worship, the bells are rung by the All Saints' Swanton Morley Bell Ringers. Also of historical interest is the Mill Bakery, which has been in business since 1645, and is one of a small number of Norfolk's organic bakeries. The Mill bakery has changed ownership and premises, and is currently owned by Budgens in Drayton, Norfolk and still continues production under the same name. The old premises including the historic mill were subsequently demolished.

The village has two public houses, The Angel and Darbys, both of which serve authentic real ale. The Angel pub is a timber-framed building which was the ancestral home of the Lincoln family, built in the 17th century by Richard Lincoln and later refaced with brick in the 19th century. The village hall, a relatively new building, is centrally located and used for community events within the village. It is regularly used by the Swanton Morley Entertainers, the Under 5's Group and the local Women's Institutes group as well as other village groups. Sports clubs include the Swanton Morley Cricket Club and the Swanton Morley Bowls Club. The village also has its own doctor's surgery, a nursing home and Swanton Morley Primary School, a voluntary controlled primary school for children aged 4 to 11. Other facilities include a butcher's, a delicatessen and a convenience store.

There are several areas to walk and enjoy the peace and tranquillity of the village, including two large areas of common land and several footpaths suitable for walks. There are also areas with opportunities for fishing on the nearby River Wensum. There was formerly a paper mill on the river which was burnt down in the 19th century. One of the former pubs in the village was called "The Papermakers". The village is home to Hunter's Hall, a large Victorian converted barn that hosts conferences and celebrations such as wedding receptions, along with bed and breakfast facilities on the Park Farm Estate on which the hall stands. In addition there are a number of holiday accommodation lets available within the village.

Military links

Since 1940 the village has been home to Robertson Barracks, formerly called RAF Swanton Morley. During the Second World War the first British and US combined bombing raid with was launched from Swanton Morley on 29 June 1942, with Prime Minister Winston Churchill and Dwight D. Eisenhower present. In 1996 the base was moved from RAF to Army control, renamed to Robertson Barracks in honour of Field Marshal Sir William Robertson and became the home to the Light Dragoons, a cavalry regiment. In March 2013 it was announced that the Light Dragoons would be leaving in 2015 and they have  been replaced by 1st The Queen's Dragoon Guards. The base is home to one of the best-preserved Art Deco air traffic control towers.

Awards
The village was voted East of England village of the year in the Calor Village of the Year 2009/10 awards. The competition recognises villages that provide "a well-balanced, pro-active, caring community which has made the best of local opportunities to maintain and enhance the quality of life for all residents". The same year Swanton Morley won the EDP Norfolk Community of the Year award.

Notable inhabitants
 Henry Ainsworth (1571–1622), Nonconformist clergyman and scholar
 Richard Lincoln (1550–1620), ancestor of Abraham Lincoln

In fiction
Professor Swanton Morley, a character in Ian Sansom's comic thriller The Norfolk Mystery (2013) is named after the village.

Gallery

See also
 Lincoln family tree

References

Bibliography

External links
 Village website
 All Saints Church website
 All Saints Swanton Morley Bell Ringers

 
Villages in Norfolk
Lincoln family
Civil parishes in Norfolk
Breckland District